The Paramillo tapaculo (Scytalopus canus) is a species of bird in the family Rhinocryptidae.

Taxonomy
It has traditionally included the more widespread S. opacus as a subspecies, but under the common name Paramo tapaculo (a name now used exclusively for S. opacus). The two have different voices, leading to them being split into separate species in 2010.

Distribution and habitat
The Paramillo tapaculo is endemic to humid highland scrub in the Cordillera Occidental in Colombia.  At present it is only known from Páramo de Paramillo and Páramo de Frontino (also known as Paramo del Sol). It may occur elsewhere in the Cordillera Occidental of Colombia. It is restricted to a narrow swath of treeline vegetation (scrub, stunted trees and Polylepis woodland) situated between montane forest and Páramo grasslands that is often just hundreds of meters wide.

Description
The Paramillo tapaculo resembles other Scytalopus tapaculos, being overall dark grey, but lacking the brown lower flanks of the Paramo tapaculo.

Status and conservation
Given the estimated extent of occurrence and observed decline in the extent and quality of habitat, the Paramillo tapaculo has an IUCN status of near threatened.  While locally common, the estimated area of suitable habitat within the known range of the Paramillo tapaculo is 3 km2 in total. Only 0.1 km2 is effectively protected by the Fundación ProAves Colibri del Sol Bird Reserve (which also harbours the highly threatened dusky starfrontlet and Fenwick's antpitta). Páramo de Paramillo is a national park, but very poorly protected.

References

 Krabbe, N., & C. D. Cadena (2010). A taxonomic revision of the Paramo Tapaculo Scytalopus canus Chapman (Aves: Rhinocryptidae), with description of a new subspecies from Ecuador and Peru. Zootaxa 2354: 56–66.
 Fundación ProAves (2010). ProAves expedition solves Tapaculo mystery. Accessed 16 February 2010.

Paramillo tapaculo
Birds of the Colombian Andes
Endemic birds of Colombia
Páramo fauna
Paramillo tapaculo